Korea Animation High School (Korean: 한국애니메이션고등학교; RR: Hanguk Aenimeisyeon Godeunghakgyo), colloquially known as Anigo (애니고) in South Korea, is a public characterized vocational secondary school in Hanam, South Korea, hosting the last three grades of secondary education in Korea. It was opened in 2000 with three educational goals: freedom, creativity, and inner beauty.

History
Korea Animation High School took in their first batch of 101 students on March 8, 2000. Current principal Choi Chang-soo was appointed on March 1, 2011, as the 6th principal of the school. As of February 2, 2015, there are a total of 1273 graduates. March 3, 2015 marked the new student admissions for the 2015 school year, with 103 students.

Departments
 Comics & Cartoon (만화창작과)
 Animation (애니메이션과)
 Film Production (영상연출과)
 Computer Game Production (컴퓨터게임제작과)

Principals
List of principals of Korea Animation High School:
 1st: Hwang Seon-gil (2000.04.17—2001.09.01)
 2nd: Park Kyung-sam (2001.09.01—2002.04.08)
 3rd: Kim Joo-young (2002.04.08—2004.09.01)
 4th: Jeong Sun-gak (2004.09.01—2008.09.01)
 5th: Choi Nak-seong (2008.09.01—2011.03.01)
 6th: Choi Chang-soo (2011.03.01—present)

Notable alumni
, actor

References

External links

 

High schools in South Korea
Schools in Gyeonggi Province
Hanam
Educational institutions established in 2000
2000 establishments in South Korea
Animation schools in South Korea
Art schools in South Korea